Anatoly Moiseev is a Russian Lightweight kickboxer. He was the 71 kg-WAKO Russian and world champion, winning both titles in 2011, and the 2019 WLF 70kg Tournament Winner.

He was ranked as a top ten lightweight by Combat Press between July 2016 and March 2017.

As of September 2016, he is ranked the #8 lightweight in the world by LiverKick.com.

Kickboxing career
Anatoly took part in the 2017 Glory Lightweight Contender tournament, facing Christian Baya in the semifinals. He lost the fight by split decision.

Moiseev participated in the 2018 Kunlun Fight 70kg Qualifying tournament, being scheduled to face Nordin Ben Moh in the semifinals. He defeated Ben Moh by unanimous decision in semifinals, and TKO'd Kong Lingfeng in the first round to win the qualifying tournament.

He lost his next fight, to the former Glory Lightweight champion Davit Kiria, by unanimous decision.

Anatoly Moiseev took part in the 2018 KLF 70 kg World tournament, being scheduled to fight Marouan Toutouh in the quarterfinals. Moiseev was a replacement for Superbon Banchamek, taking the fight on a ten days notice. Toutouh won the fight by unanimous decision.

Moiseev was scheduled to take part in the 2019 Kunlun Fight 70 kg tournament on December 31. The event was later rescheduled for March 8, 2020. Due to the COVID-19 pandemic, the event was ultimately cancelled.

Titles
Amateur
World Association of Kickboxing Organizations
 2011 WAKO World Championships Low Kick -71kg Champion

Professional
Wu Lin Feng
 2019 Wu Lin Feng World Tournament -70kg Champion

Mixed martial arts record

|-
|Win
|align=center|5–0
|Nurzhigit Karaev
|Decision (split)
|MMA Series 51: Black Smith
|
|align=center|3
|align=center|5:00
|Anapa, Russia
|-
|Win
|align=center|4–0
|Sherzod Khusunov
|Submission (guillotine choke)
|Blacksmith Fight Championship 3
|
|align=center|1
|align=center|0:32
|Anapa, Russia
|-
|Win
|align=center|3–0
|Azatbek Erkinbek Uulu
|TKO (punches)
|Open Fighting Championship 6
|
|align=center|1
|align=center|4:03
|Krasnodar, Russia
|-
|Win
|align=center|2–0
|Konstantin Cherednichenko
|TKO (body shots)
|MMA SERIES-27: Time of New Heroes 14
|
|align=center|1
|align=center|0:34
|Saint Petersburg, Russia
|
|-
|Win
|align=center|1–0
|Anthony Serre
|TKO (low kicks)
|MMA SERIES-17: Blacksmith Fighting Championship 2
|
|align=center|1
|align=center|1:06
|Anapa, Russia
|

Kickboxing record

|-  style="background:#CCFFCC" 
| 2019-05-25 || Win ||align=left| Giannis Boukis || Wu Lin Feng 2019: WLF 70kg World Championship Tournament, Final  || Zhengzhou, China || KO (Spinning back kick to the body) || 1 || 
|-
! style=background:white colspan=9 |
|-  style="background:#CCFFCC" 
| 2019-05-25 || Win ||align=left| Mitchel Lammers || Wu Lin Feng 2019: WLF 70kg World Championship Tournament, Semi Final || Zhengzhou, China || TKO (Corner Stoppage) || 1 || 3:00
|-  style="background:#CCFFCC" 
| 2019-05-25 || Win ||align=left| Zhang Weipeng || Wu Lin Feng 2019: WLF 70kg World Championship Tournament, Quarter Final || Zhengzhou, China || KO (Body punch) || 1 || 2:40
|-
|-  bgcolor="#FFBBBB"
|  2018-10-13 || Loss|| align="left" |  Marouan Toutouh || Kunlun Fight 77: Hollow Throne (quarter-finals) ||Tongling, China||Decision (Unanimous)||3|| 3:00
|-
|-  bgcolor="#FFBBBB"
|  2018-08-05 || Loss|| align="left" | Davit Kiria  || Kunlun Fight 75 || Sanya, China ||Decision (Unanimous) ||3|| 3:00
|-  style="background:#CCFFCC" 
| 2018-04-01 || Win ||align=left| Kong Lingfeng || Kunlun Fight 71, Final  || Qingdao, China || TKO || 1 || 3:00
|-  style="background:#CCFFCC" 
| 2018-04-01 || Win ||align=left| Nordin Ben Moh || Kunlun Fight 71, Semi Finals   || Qingdao, China || Decision (unanimous) || 3 || 3:00
|-  bgcolor="#FFBBBB"
| 2017-06-10 || Loss ||align=left| Christian Baya || Glory 42: Paris - Lightweight Contender Tournament, Semi Finals  || Paris, France || Decision (split) || 3 || 3:00
|-
|-  bgcolor="#FFBBBB"
| 2017-01-24 || Loss ||align=left| Mohamed Diaby || Kung Fu World Championship - 75kg Contender Sanda Tournament, Semi Final  || Hunan, China || KO (Right High Kick) || 2 || 1:55
|-
|-  bgcolor="#FFBBBB"
| 2016-12-10 || Loss ||align=left| Dylan Salvador || Glory 36: Oberhausen - Lightweight Contender Tournament, Semi Finals  || Oberhausen, Germany || Decision (unanimous) || 3 || 3:00
|-
|-  bgcolor="#CCFFCC" 
| 2016-09-11|| Win ||align=left|  Tamaz Izoria || Kunlun Fight 52 || Fuzhou, China || Decision (unanimous) || 3 || 3:00
|-  
|-  bgcolor="#CCFFCC"
| 2016-06-25|| Win ||align=left|  Josh Jauncey || Glory 31: Amsterdam || Amsterdam, Netherlands || Decision (Unanimous) || 3 || 3:00
|-  
|-  bgcolor="#CCFFCC"
| 2016-05-14|| Win ||align=left|  Serginio Kanters || Kunlun Fight 44   || Khabarovsk, Russia || KO (Right Hook) || 2 || 0:28
|-  
|-  bgcolor="#FFBBBB"
| 2016-03-12 || Loss ||align=left| Marat Grigorian || Glory 28: Paris - Lightweight Contender Tournament, Semi Finals || Paris, France || Decision (unanimous) || 3 || 3:00
|-  
|-  bgcolor="#CCFFCC"
| 2016-01-23|| Win ||align=left|  Jonay Risco || Kunlun Fight 37   || Sanya, China || Decision (Unanimous) || 3 || 3:00
|-  
|-  bgcolor="#CCFFCC"
| 2015-11-06 || Win ||align=left|  Teo Mikelić || Glory 25: Milan || Milan, Italy || Decision (Unanimous)  || 3 || 3:00 
|-  
|-  bgcolor="#CCFFCC"
| 2015-09-04|| Win ||align=left|  Rosario Presti || Tatneft Cup 2015 || Kazan, Russia || Decision  || 4 || 3:00
|-  
|-  bgcolor="#CCFFCC"
| 2015-08-15|| Win ||align=left|  Cristian Milea || Kunlun Fight 29 || Sochi, Russia || Decision (Unanimous)  || 3 || 3:00
|-  bgcolor="#CCFFCC"
| 2015-05-29|| Win ||align=left|  Malic Groenberg || Tatneft Cup 2015 || Kazan, Russia || Decision  || 4 || 3:00
|-  
|-  bgcolor="#CCFFCC"
| 2015-04-24|| Win ||align=left|  Evgeniy Kurovsky || W5 Grand Prix: Kitek || Moscow, Russia || TKO || 1 || 3:00
|-  
|-  bgcolor="#CCFFCC"
| 2015-04-03 || Win ||align=left|  Max Baumert || Glory 20: Dubai || Dubai, UAE || KO (Right High Kick)  || 1 || 0:38 
|-  
|-  bgcolor="#CCFFCC"
| 2015-02-21|| Win ||align=left|  Itay Gershon || Tatneft Cup 2015 || Kazan, Russia || Decision  || 4 || 3:00
|-  
|-  bgcolor="#CCFFCC"
| 2014-09-19|| Win ||align=left|  Vasilly Goral || Tech-KREP-FC-PRIME 3 || Krasnodar, Russia || Decision (Unanimous)  || 3 || 3:00
|-  
|-  bgcolor="#CCFFCC"
| 2014-03-21|| Win ||align=left|  Romano Morjoner || Tech-KREP-FC-PRIME 1 || Krasnodar, Russia || TKO   || 2 || 1:50
|-  
|-  bgcolor="#CCFFCC"
| 2013-08-31|| Win ||align=left|  Islam Murtazaev || Oracul Fight Zone 2013|| Russia || Decision (Unanimous)|| 3 || 3:00
|-  
|-  bgcolor="#CCFFCC"
| 2013-06-02|| Win ||align=left|  Alexander Topich || GFC - Challenge ||Krasnodar, Russia || Decision (Unanimous)|| 3 || 3:00
|-  
|-  bgcolor="#CCFFCC"
| 2010-11-26|| Win ||align=left|  Vitaliy Soroka || Oracul Fight Zone 2010 ||Krasnodar, Russia || Decision || 3 || 3:00
|-
| colspan=9 | Legend:

See also
List of male kickboxers

References

Living people
1989 births
Russian male kickboxers
Lightweight kickboxers
Kunlun Fight kickboxers
People from Krymsk
Sportspeople from Krasnodar Krai
Russian male mixed martial artists